Þórvaldr Hjaltason was a late 10th-century Icelandic skald in the service of the Swedish king Eric the Victorious. 

He is listed in Skáldatal as in Eric's service. Styrbjarnar þáttr Svíakappa recounts that he took part in the Battle of the Fýrisvellir against Styrbjörn the Strong and in response to the king's call for verses commemorating the victory, composed in dróttkvætt the following two lausavísur:

These are the only verses attributed to him; the tale says that he received a ring worth half a mark for each verse, and that he is not known to have composed any other verses, either before or after. He may have brought the news of the battle back to Iceland.

He may be the same person as the Þorvaldr Hjaltason who is mentioned with his brother Þórðr in Landnamabók and a number of Sagas of Icelanders, but that Þorvaldr is not said to be a skald.

References 

10th-century Icelandic poets